Judith Maria Holzmeister (14 February 1920 – 23 June 2008) was an Austrian actress. Her performances included Kunigunde opposite Ewald Balser in Franz Grillparzer's König Ottokars Glück und Ende at the reopening of the famed Vienna Burgtheater in 1955.

Judith Holzmeister was born in Innsbruck, Austria, on 14 February 1920, the daughter of Clemens Holzmeister. She began her career in acting with her debut at the Provincial Theater in Linz, Austria. Holzmeister began working at the Burgtheater in 1947, and remained at that particular theater until her retirement.

Holzmeister worked at the Vienna Volkstheater during World War II. She was involved with anti-Nazi resistance groups during the war and helped to hide Jews from Nazi German authorities.

Holzmeister also enjoyed an acting career within television and film. She was a recipient of the Kainz Medal, an award for prominent actors which was handed out annually between 1958 and 1999.

She was married to the actors Curd Jürgens (1947–1955) and Bruno Dallansky (1959 until her death in 2008).

Judith Holzmeister died at the age of 88 on 23 June 2008, in Baden, Austria. Dallansky died six weeks later.

Selected filmography
 The Fire Devil (1940)
 Viennese Girls (1945)
 Bonus on Death (1950)
 House of Life (1952)
 Goetz von Berlichingen (1955)
  (1970, TV miniseries)

References

External links 
 

1920 births
2008 deaths
20th-century Austrian actresses
Austrian stage actresses
Austrian film actresses
Austrian television actresses
Actors from Innsbruck